Grand Haven High School (GHHS) is a public secondary school in Grand Haven, Michigan, United States. It is the sole comprehensive high school in the Grand Haven Public Schools district, and one of two in northwest Ottawa County; the other being Spring Lake High School.

Demographics 
The demographic breakdown for the 1,781 students enrolled in 2020–21 at Grand Haven High School was:

 Male - 49.6%
 Female - 50.4%
 Native American - 0.2%
 Asian - 2.1%
 Black - 1.7%
 Hispanic - 4.6%
 Pacific Islander - 0.1%
 White - 88.9%
 Multiracial - 2.5%

In addition, 411 students (23.1%) of students were eligible for reduced-price or free lunch.

Notable alumni 
 Garrett Clark Borns - Singer, songwriter, and multi-instrumentalist, known by the stage name Børns
 Jim Linderman - Writer, collector, and visual artist
 John Potter - Former American football placekicker

References

External links 

 

Grand Haven, Michigan
Public high schools in Michigan
Educational institutions established in 1880
Schools in Ottawa County, Michigan
1880 establishments in Michigan
School buildings completed in 1997